The 2021 Asian Airgun Championships were held at Shooting Plaza Complex, Shymkent, Kazakhstan between 12 and 19 September 2021.

Medal summary

Men

Women

Mixed

Medal table

References

External links 
 Official Results

Asian Shooting Championships
Shooting
Asian
Asian Airgun Championships
Asian Airgun Championships